Donna Ockenden  is a British midwife and community activist. She was commissioned in 2016 by the then UK Secretary for Health and Social Care, Jeremy Hunt, to chair an independent review into maternity services at Shrewsbury and Telford Hospital NHS Trust. Initial findings of the Ockenden Review were reported in December 2020, with a final report published on 17th March 2022. In May 2022, it was announced by NHS England that Donna Ockenden would chair an independent review of maternity services at Nottingham University Hospitals NHS Trust (NUH). This review commenced at the beginning of September 2022.

In February 2021, Donna Ockenden was named as a Fellow of the Royal Society for the Encouragement of Arts, Manufacture and Commerce.

The fellowship is awarded by the Royal Society of Arts (RSA), and is limited to individuals determined to have made outstanding achievements to social progress and development. The accolade has been awarded to Donna Ockenden for her work which has touched the lives of many throughout her career. Her work has been a catalyst for change to improve the quality of care for a broad section of people who use healthcare services across the UK.

Donna Ockenden has been appointed as honorary president of Baby Lifeline, the mother and baby charity founded 40 years ago by Judy Ledger following the personal tragedy of losing three premature babies.

Life
In 1985, aged 18, Ockenden found herself homeless in Bristol, with responsibility for her four younger siblings, aged four to sixteen.

From 2013 to 2017 Ockenden was first clinical director of midwifery, jointly with a Co clinical director, Obstetrics at the London Strategic Clinical Network at NHS England. In 2015 the Nursing and Midwifery Council also appointed her as a Senior Midwifery Adviser in chief to the Chief Executive.

Ockenden lives in Chichester. In January 2016 she and her daughters founded The Four Streets Project, a charity to support Chichester's homeless population. She also started the Community Coat Rack, which gives free coats to those in need in the winter. Chichester District Council gave Ockenden a civic award in February 2019. In 2022, Ockenden was named in the Vogue 25 'honouring the women shaping and remaking Britain in 2022'. Also in 2022, Ockenden was named in the HSJ Top 100 Healthcare Leaders across the UK

References

External links
 donnaockenden.com
 ockendenmaternityreview.org.uk
 Donna Ockenden FRSA on Twitter

Year of birth missing (living people)
1960s births
Living people
English midwives